The fish pepper is a small Chili pepper cultivar of the species Capsicum annuum. It is a historical variety from African-American communities in the Chesapeake. The plant has variegated foliage and the peppers ripen from white with green streaks to a dark red color. Its pungency can range, with scoville heat units from 5,000 to 30,000.

Origin

Prelude
Capsicum annuum is a species of the plant in the family solanacea. Its origins are obscure but it's believed to originally be native to southern Mexico, where its center of diversity exists. Being cultivated by mesoamerican societies since roughly 8000 b.c, it would later spread throughout most of southern North America and South America. By the time of Columbus's arrival to the Americas cultivation had been noted in the Caribbean.

History
From the Caribbean it made its way to the Chesapeake where it was noted to have been grown by enslaved Africans in Baltimore. Food historian Michael W. Twitty believes them to have originally have been brought by Haitians. By 1870, particularly in Baltimore and in Philadelphia, the pepper became a popular ingredient among the Black community and was commonly used in many crab houses and oyster bars (hence the name "fish pepper"). Due to urbanization, fish peppers declined in popularity in the early 20th century, nearly disappearing. However, it was saved in the 1940s thanks to Horace Pippin, a Black folk painter who lived in Pennsylvania, who provided seeds to H. Ralph Weaver, a beekeeper, in exchange for bee sting therapy to treat his arthritis. The seeds stayed within the Weaver family, until Weaver's grandson, William Woys Weaver, introduced the seeds to the public via the Seed Savers Exchange Yearbook in 1995. Since then, the fish pepper has regained popularity and is readily available among seed websites along with some Mid-Atlantic restaurants using it today in their dishes.

Description
The color of the fruit range from green, orange, brown, white and red, being spicy and hot. What really makes this pepper stand out is its wonderful foliage, as the 2’ tall plants have stunning white and green mottled leaves, which makes this variety superb for ornamental and edible landscaping.

Fish peppers have a vibrant appearance, making them popular as ornamental peppers. As they grow, their color varies greatly, progressing from an initial creamy white color to red when they mature. Fish peppers are typically hot peppers, and their heat can range from 5,000 to 30,000 on the Scoville scale.

See also
List of Capsicum cultivars
Sea island red peas
Carolina gold rice

References

Chili peppers
Capsicum cultivars